Hamaijan Rural District is a rural district (dehestan) in Hamaijan District, Sepidan County, Fars Province, Iran. At the 2006 census, its population (including the villages subsequently detached from the rural district and combined to form the city of Hamashahr) was 15,449, in 3,546 families; excluding those villages, the population (as of 2006) was 12,064, in 2,997 families.  The rural district has 37 villages.

References 

Rural Districts of Fars Province
Sepidan County